Enzo Spaltro, born Vincenzo Spaltro (Milan, July 3, 1929 – Bologna, March 26, 2021), was an Italian psychologist, academic and television author, a pupil of Agostino Gemelli at the Catholic University of the Sacred Heart in Milan; he specialized with him in work psychology and developed his ideas becoming one of the leading professionals in this field.

In 2007 he founded the Università delle persone in Bologna at the age of 78, based on the idea of a non-formal university with no pre-established roles.

References 

1929 births
2021 deaths
Italian academics
Italian psychologists